Etuini Haloti Ngata (born January 21, 1984) is an American former professional football player who was a defensive tackle in the National Football League (NFL). He played college football for the University of Oregon and earned consensus All-American honors. Ngata was drafted by the Baltimore Ravens in the first round of the 2006 NFL Draft, and was selected for the Pro Bowl five times. Ngata played for the Ravens for nine seasons before being traded to the Detroit Lions before the 2015 NFL season. Ngata was also a member of the Philadelphia Eagles for one season in 2018 before retiring.

Early years
Ngata, of Tongan ancestry, was born in Inglewood, California.  He attended Highland High School, where he played on the football team in Salt Lake City, Utah. He was a three-year starter on the defensive line. As a senior, he recorded over 200 tackles and led his team to the state quarterfinals, following a 12–2 record and a berth in the State Championship as a junior. Ngata was named the 2001 Utah Gatorade Player of the Year and a first-team USA Today All-USA selection.  He played in the 2002 U.S. Army All-American Bowl.

Ngata was listed as a five-star recruit and the No. 2 overall prospect in the nation by Rivals.com. He chose Oregon over BYU, Nebraska, Texas A&M, and Washington.

Ngata also played rugby in high school, and helped lead the Highland Rugby Club to the National Rugby Championship. He was red carded in the championship match.

College career
A devout member of the Church of Jesus Christ of Latter-Day Saints, Ngata said he felt most at home at Brigham Young University, but struggled to make his college decision. He eventually signed a national letter of intent to play for the Oregon Ducks football team of the University of Oregon. Ngata tore his anterior cruciate ligament (ACL) on a punt coverage play in 2003 and missed the rest of that season. But over the next two seasons, Ngata became one of the best players in college football. Ngata totaled 107 tackles, 17.5 tackles for a loss, and 6.5 sacks total in the 2004 and 2005 seasons.  He was a second-team All-Pac-10 selection in 2004, a first-team All-Pac-10 selection in 2005.  Following his junior season in 2005, he was recognized as the Pac-10 Defensive Player of the Year and a consensus first-team All-American, Oregon's first in 43 years. Ngata also earned praise as a dangerous special teams player, blocking 7 kicks during his 3-year career at Oregon.

He had a  bench press max, which ranks second all-time among Oregon Ducks football players, behind only Igor Olshansky's .

Professional career

2006 NFL Draft
Ngata decided to leave Oregon a year early because his mother, 'Ofa, was in the early stages of kidney dialysis. She died from her illness on January 13, 2006.

Ngata was selected by the Baltimore Ravens in the first round with the 12th overall pick in the 2006 NFL Draft. It was the first time in franchise history the Ravens used a first round pick on a defensive lineman. Ngata became the highest selected defensive lineman from the current Pac-12 conference since Andre Carter in 2001.

Baltimore Ravens

2006–2007

On July 28, 2006, Ngata ended a brief contract holdout by agreeing to a 5-year contract worth up to $14 million with the Baltimore Ravens. In his first game in Week 1 against the Tampa Bay Buccaneers, he returned an interception 60 yards to the Tampa Bay 9 yard-line which led to a field goal in a 27–0 win. In a Week 16 game against the Pittsburgh Steelers, he recorded his first career sack in the second quarter on a 3-yard sack of Ben Roethlisberger in a 31–7 win. In his rookie season, he started in all 16 games and finished the campaign with 31 tackles, one sack, and an interception. The following season, he made 63 tackles and three sacks.

2008
In the 2008 season, Ngata started all 16 regular season and three postseason games. He led the Ravens defensive line with 77 total tackles (43 Solo, 34 Assist), one sack, a career-high 2 Interceptions, and 5 passes deflected as part of the NFL's #2 passing defense. He was named to the Pro Bowl as a first alternate and earned Second-team All-Pro honors by the Associated Press for the first time in his career.

2009
During the 2009 season, Ngata started all 16 Ravens regular season and both post-season games. During the regular season, he recorded 36 tackles, of which 26 were unassisted and 1.5 sacks. He was selected for the first time in his career to play in the NFL Pro Bowl.

2010

After an outstanding 2010 season which included 63 tackles and 5.5 sacks, Ngata was selected to the 2010 All-Fundamentals Team by USA Football and the NFL Players Association.

2011
On February 15, the Ravens placed their franchise tag on Ngata. On September 20, he was signed to a 5-year deal worth $61 million.

The Ravens opened the 2011 season at home against the Pittsburgh Steelers on September 11.  In the game Ngata forced a fumble and tipped a pass that led to a Ray Lewis interception; the Ravens won 35–7. Two weeks later against the St. Louis Rams, Ray Lewis sacked Sam Bradford. Bradford fumbled, and the ball was recovered by Ngata who scored his first career regular season touchdown.

On October 2, 2011, during the Ravens game against the New York Jets, Ngata sacked Jets quarterback Mark Sanchez, causing Sanchez to fumble the ball. Ravens linebacker Jarrett Johnson picked up the fumble and returned it for a touchdown.  The Ravens won the game by a score of 34–17.  After reviewing the hit, the NFL levied a $15,000 fine against Ngata for roughing the passer even though no penalty was called by officials during the game.

Ngata finished the season with a career-high 64 tackles (36 unassisted), along with 5 sacks, 2 forced fumbles, and 5 passes defended. Ngata also earned his third straight Pro Bowl appearance.

2012
During the 2012 season, Ngata played mostly defensive tackle and sometimes defensive end, collecting 5 sacks and 51 tackles overall. Ngata played in all four games of the Ravens 2012 postseason, recording 10 solo tackles and 3 assisted tackles as he helped the Ravens to victory in Super Bowl XLVII. A notable incident that occurred in this season happened in Week 14, when he hit Washington Redskins' rookie quarterback Robert Griffin III in his right knee, twisting it. Griffin would re-injure this knee later in the season, forcing him to undergo surgery.

2013
In 2013, Ngata played mostly as a nose tackle making 33 tackles, 1.5 sacks, and 3 passes defended in 15 games played.

2014
On August 29, 2014, Ngata was fined $8,268 for intentionally kicking Washington Redskins guard Shawn Lauvao during the final preseason game.

On December 4, 2014, Ngata was suspended for four games after he violated the NFL's policy on performance-enhancing substances.

Detroit Lions

2015
On March 10, 2015, Ngata was traded to the Detroit Lions in exchange for a 2015 4th round pick (used to select Za'Darius Smith) and a 2015 5th round pick (used by the Arizona Cardinals to select Shaquille Riddick) to play defensive tackle. Ngata struggled in the first half of the season with an injury, but gained momentum and finished with 2.5 sacks and 24 tackles.

2016
On March 9, 2016, the Detroit Lions re-signed Ngata to a two-year, $12 million contract, with $6 million guaranteed. Ngata was hampered by a shoulder injury that limited his playing time. Overall, he played 13 games and finished the 2016 season with 22 tackles, 1.5 sacks, and three passes defended.

2017
On October 11, 2017, Ngata was placed on injured reserve after suffering a torn biceps in Week 5 against the Carolina Panthers. He started all five games before the injury and recorded seven tackles and a pass deflection.

Philadelphia Eagles

2018
On March 15, 2018, Ngata signed a one-year contract with the Philadelphia Eagles. In his lone season with the Eagles he appeared in 13 games and had 17 tackles, including a sack.

Retirement
On March 18, 2019, Ngata announced his retirement from the NFL with an Instagram post of him atop of Mount Kilimanjaro with a banner "I'm retiring from the NFL on top". On May 28, 2019, the Ravens announced he will sign a one-day ceremonial contract with the team to retire as a Raven. At his retirement press conference, it was also announced that Ngata will be inducted into the Baltimore Ravens Ring of Honor. He was inducted on October 11, 2021.

NFL career statistics

Awards and honors

NFL
 Super Bowl champion (XLVII)
 2× First-team All-Pro (2010, 2011)
 3× Second-team All-Pro (2008, 2009, 2012)
 5× Pro Bowl (2009–2013)
 PFWA All-Rookie Team (2006)
 Baltimore Ravens Ring of Honor

College
 Consensus All-American (2005)	
 First-team All-Pac-10 (2005)
 Second-team All-Pac-10 (2004)
 Pac-10 Co-Defensive Player of the Year (2005)
 Morris Trophy (2005)

Personal life
Ngata was born in Inglewood, California, to Solomone Ngata and 'Ofa (née Moala), who had emigrated from Tonga to the United States in the early 1970s. He has two older brothers, Solomone Jr. and Finau, a younger brother, Vili, and a younger sister, Ame. Haloti Ngata was named after his maternal uncle,  Haloti Moala-Liava'a, who was a middle linebacker for the Utah Utes (1984–1988). The family moved to Salt Lake City, Utah, in 1990. In December 2002, Ngata's father died in a single-vehicle truck accident, while trying to climb the on-ramp to Interstate 80 from Route 215 just outside Salt Lake City. His mother, having battled with Chronic Kidney Disease/Diabetic Nephropathy for years, died in January 2006.

Ngata's extended family includes numerous athletes. One of his cousins, Tevita Moala, was a starting linebacker on Oregon State's 2000 Fiesta Bowl team.  Another cousin, Fili Moala, was an All-American defensive lineman at Southern California (2004–2008), and subsequently played for the Indianapolis Colts. Ngata is also a distant relative of basketball player Jabari Parker and PGA Tour Golfer Tony Finau.

Ngata resides in Park City, Utah with his wife Christina Ngata (née Adams) whom he married in June 2007. The couple has three sons: Solomon (born July 2009), named after his late grandfather; Haloti Maximus (born August 2012); and Colt (born January 2014).

References

External links

 Detroit Lions bio
 Baltimore Ravens bio
 Oregon Ducks bio

1984 births
Living people
All-American college football players
American Conference Pro Bowl players
American football defensive ends
American football defensive tackles
American Latter Day Saints
American people of Tongan descent
American rugby union players
Baltimore Ravens players
Detroit Lions players
Oregon Ducks football players
Philadelphia Eagles players
Players of American football from Inglewood, California
Unconferenced Pro Bowl players
Rugby union players that played in the NFL